Ancilla exigua is a species of sea snail, a marine gastropod mollusk in the family Ancillariidae.

Description

Distribution

References

exigua
Gastropods described in 1830